is a small near-Earth asteroid roughly 1–2 meters in diameter. Even though the asteroid was in the night sky for months, it was fainter than the sky survey limit of apparent magnitude 24 until 29 October 2019 when the asteroid was two million km from Earth. It was discovered on October 31, 2019, passing 6,200 km above Earth's surface.

An impact by  would be less significant than the 2018 LA impact.

2019 flyby

 5 minute markers of trajectory above the earth near closest approach

Orbit changes
The close approach to Earth lifted the asteroid's aphelion point (furthest distance from the Sun) from 1.33 AU (inside the orbit of Mars) to 2.06 AU (near the edge of the inner asteroid belt). The approach changed the orbit from an Aten asteroid with a semi-major axis less than 1 AU to an Apollo asteroid with a semi-major axis greater than that of the Earth (> 1 AU).

With the new orbit,  will come to perihelion 0.83 AU from the Sun on 15 December 2019. Without perturbations, the previous orbit would have come to perihelion in January 2020.

Future
There is a small chance the asteroid will pass  from Mars on 26 October 2023. There is also a 1 in 3 million chance the asteroid will impact Earth on 1 November 2111.

See also

References

External links
 MPEC 2019-V09 : 2019 UN13, Minor Planet Electronic Circular, 1 November 2019
 Catalina Sky Survey Scares-Up Tiny Earth-Grazing Halloween Asteroid, CSS, 1 November 2019
 Small asteroid paid a heavy price for almost striking Earth Thursday, EarthSky, 1 November 2019
 This small asteroid almost struck Earth on Halloween, Deseret News, 1 November 2019
 2019 UN13 Geometry, IAWN – International Asteroid Warning Network
 
 

20191031

Discoveries by the Catalina Sky Survey
Minor planet object articles (unnumbered)
Potential impact events caused by near-Earth objects